The Golden Age of Islam, which saw a flourishing of science, 
notably mathematics and astronomy, especially during the 9th and 10th centuries, had a notable Indian influence.

History
For the best part of a millennium, from  the Seleucid era and through to the Sassanid period, there had been an exchange of scholarship between the Greek, Persian and Indian cultural spheres. The origin of the number zero and the place-value system notably falls into this period; its early use originates in Indian mathematics of the 5th century (Lokavibhaga), influencing Sassanid era Persian scholars during the 6th century.

The sudden Islamic conquest of Persia in the 640s drove a wedge between the Mediterranean and Indian traditions, but scholarly transfer soon resumed, with translations of both Greek and Sanskrit works into Arabic during the 8th century. This triggered the flourishing of Abbasid-era scholarship centered in Baghdad in the 9th century, and the eventual resumption of transmission to the west via Muslim Spain and Sicily by the 10th century.

There was continuing contact between Indian and Perso-Arabic scholarship during the 9th to 11th centuries while the Muslim conquest of India was temporarily halted.
Al Biruni in the early 11th century traveled widely in India and became an important source of knowledge about India in the Islamic world during that time.

With the establishment of the Delhi Sultanate in the 13th century, northern India fell under Perso-Arabic dominance and the native Sanskrit tradition fell into decline, while at about the same time the "Golden Age of Islam" of the Arab caliphates gave way to Turko-Mongol dominance, leading to the flourishing of a secondary "Golden Age" of  Turko-Persian literary tradition  during the 13th to 16th centuries, exemplified on either side of Timurid Persia by the Ottoman Empire in the west and the Mughal Empire in the east.

Astronomy
The mathematical astronomy text Brahmasiddhanta of Brahmagupta (598-668) was received in the court of Al-Mansur (753–774). It was translated by Alfazari into Arabic as Az-Zīj ‛alā Sinī al-‛Arab, popularly called Sindhind. This translation was the means by which the Hindu numerals were transmitted from the Sanskrit to the Arabic tradition. According to Al-Biruni,

Alberuni's translator and editor Edward Sachau wrote: "It is Brahmagupta who taught Arabs mathematics before they got acquainted with Greek science."
Al-Fazari also translated the Khandakhadyaka (Arakand) of Brahmagupta.

Through the resulting Arabic translations of Sindhind and Arakand, the use of Indian numerals became established in the Islamic world.

Mathematics
The etymology of the word "sine" comes from the Latin mistranslation of the word jiba, which is an Arabic transliteration of the Sanskrit word for half the chord, jya-ardha.

The sin and cos functions of trigonometry, were important mathematical concepts, imported from the Gupta period of Indian astronomy namely the jyā and koṭi-jyā  functions via translation of texts like the Aryabhatiya and Surya Siddhanta, from Sanskrit to Arabic, and then from Arabic to Latin, and later to other European languages.

	
Abu'l-Hasan al-Uqlidisi a scholar in the Abbasid caliphate wrote al-Fusul fi al-Hisab al-Hindi ("chapters in Indian calculation") to address the difficulty in procedures for calculation from the Euclid's Elements and endorsed the use of Indian calculation.  He highlighted its ease of use, speed, fewer requirements of memory and the focused scope on the subject.

Medical texts
Manka, an Indian physician at the court of Harun al-Rashid  translated the Sushruta (the classical  (Gupta-era) Sanskrit text on medicine) into Persian.

Al-Razi's Al-Hawi (liber continens) of c. 900 is said to contain "much Indian knowledge" from texts such as the Susruta Samhita.

Geography
The Indian geographical knowledge that was transmitted and influenced the Arabs included the view of Aryabhata that the apparent daily rotation of the heavens was caused by the rotation of the earth on its own axis, the idea that the proportion of land and sea on the surface of the earth was half and half and the land mass as being dome shaped and covered on all sides by water.

The Arabs utilized the Indian cartographic system in which the northern hemisphere was considered to be the inhabited part of the earth and divided into nine parts. Its four geographical limits were djamakut in the east, rum in the west, Ceylon as the cupola (dome) and Sidpur.

Indians believed that the prime meridian passes through ujjain and calculated their longitudes from Ceylon. The Arabs adopted this idea of Ceylon's being the cupola of the earth but later mistakenly believed ujjain to be the cupola.

See also
Science and technology in India
Indian mathematics
Indian astronomy
Bakhshali manuscript
Bakhshali approximation
Barmakids
Indo-Persian culture

References

External links
 The Development of The numerals Among The Arabs: chapter from the book – The Hindu-Arabic Numerals By David Eugene Smith

Science in the medieval Islamic world
History of science and technology in India
Science in the Middle Ages
Indosphere
Ancient Indian literature